Patrick Whistler Neate (born 2 May 1946) is an English former cricketer.  Neate was a right-handed batsman who bowled right-arm medium pace.  He was born at Newbury, Berkshire.

Neate made his only first-class appearance for Oxford University in 1966, against Nottinghamshire.  Neate scored just 3 runs in the match.

Two years prior to playing for Oxford University, Neate made his Minor Counties Championship debut for Berkshire in 1964 against Dorset.  From 1964 to 1979, he represented the county in 77 Minor Counties Championship matches, the last of which came in the 1979 Championship when Berkshire played Devon.

Family
His brother Francis Neate also played first-class matches for Oxford University, as well as playing Minor Counties cricket and List-A cricket for Berkshire from 1958 to 1979. Francis Neate was the Berkshire captain from 1971 to 1975, with Patrick playing under him.  Their father, also called Francis, played Minor Counties cricket for Berkshire in 1932 and 1933.

References

External links
Patrick Neate at Cricinfo
Patrick Neate at CricketArchive

1946 births
Living people
People from Newbury, Berkshire
English cricketers
Oxford University cricketers
Berkshire cricketers
Alumni of Brasenose College, Oxford